The Edmond post office shooting was a mass shooting that occurred in Edmond, Oklahoma, on August 20, 1986. In less than fifteen minutes, 44 year-old postal worker Patrick Sherrill pursued and shot several coworkers, killing 14 and injuring another six, before committing suicide. It is currently the deadliest workplace shooting in U.S. history, as well as the deadliest shooting by a lone gunman in the state of Oklahoma. 

The attack inspired the American phrase "going postal".

Background
Sherrill was a relief carrier, meaning he was often required to work alternate routes on different days, a position dictated by his rank on the seniority list. His lack of a permanently assigned route meant that he lacked the same job stability as other USPS workers. Opinions vary concerning his job performance. Some reports portray him as an erratic, irritable worker; others claim he performed well and was being badgered by management. In any case, on the afternoon of August 19, 1986, supervisors Esser and Bland reprimanded Sherrill for his behavior.

Shooting
Shortly after 7:00 a.m. on August 20, 1986, Patrick Sherrill killed Richard Esser, Jr., one of two supervisors who had verbally disciplined him the previous day. Sherrill then sought out Bill Bland, another supervisor who had reprimanded him. However, Bland had overslept that morning and arrived an hour late to work, by which time the shootings were already over. Not finding Bland, Sherrill then killed co-worker Paul Michael Rockne.

Around 100 workers occupied the small facility at the time of the attack. Fourteen people died at the scene, and six others received wounds requiring hospitalization. The day's violence ended when Sherrill shot himself in the forehead.

Victims

Fourteen people were killed in the shooting, while six others were injured. The victims were:

Killed
 Patricia Ann Chambers, 41, part-time clerk
 Judy Stephens Denney, 41, part-time clerk
 Richard C. Esser Jr., 38, supervisor
 Patricia A. Gabbard, 47, clerk
 Jonna Ruth Gragert, 30, clerk
 Patty Jean Husband, 48, supervisor
 Betty Ann Jarred, 34, clerk
 William F. Miller, 30, rural carrier
 Kenneth W. Morey, 49, rural carrier
 Leroy Orrin Phillips, 42, rural carrier
 Jerry Ralph Pyle, 51, rural carrier
 Paul Michael Rockne, 33, letter carrier
 Thomas Wade Shader Jr., 31, part-time clerk
 Patti Lou Welch, 27, clerk

Injured
 William Nimmo
 Gene Bray
 Michael H. Bigler
 Steve Vick
 Judy Walker
 Joyce Ingram

Memorial

The Yellow Ribbon Memorial is a commemorative outdoor structure dedicated to the victims of the Edmond, Oklahoma post office shooting. Dedicated on May 29, 1989, it is located outside the post office's main entry to the south. The memorial contains the bronze statue of a man and a woman standing atop the fountain's center base and holding the ribbon of which the bow is attached to the base. To represent the fourteen victims killed in the shooting, the fountain contains fourteen water jets and a plaque on the front of the base listing their names. 

The memorial was built by the Edmond community and the United States Postal Services; the statue was created by sculptor Richard Muno (1939–2015). Community members have gathered at the memorial to commemorate the victims, especially on the 25th (2011) and 30th (2016) anniversaries.

The memorial was surveyed in May 1996 as "well maintained", categorized by the Smithsonian American Art Museum. Over the years, the memorial slowly deteriorated with apparent "cracks in the concrete". Throughout the early 2010s, operations of the fountain were halted for, according to USPS, "a damaged water supply line". As of 2016, the fountain still operates seasonally.

Perpetrator
Patrick Henry Sherrill (November 13, 1941 – August 20, 1986) was born in Watonga, Oklahoma, and had served in the United States Marine Corps. He was considered an expert marksman and was a member of a National Guard pistol team.

Subsequent postal shooting incidents

The 1986 Edmond incident was the first of several highly publicized postal shootings.
 1991, Ridgewood, New Jersey
 1991, Royal Oak, Michigan
 1993, Dearborn, Michigan
 1993, Dana Point, California
 1995, Montclair, New Jersey
 1997, Milwaukee, Wisconsin
 2006, Goleta, California

See also

 Mass shootings in the United States
 Gun violence in the United States
 List of rampage killers (workplace killings)
 Workplace violence
 Organizational conflict
 Workplace aggression

Footnotes

References

External links
 "Going postal"
 "Crazy Pat's" Revenge, Time (June 24, 2001)
 "The loner: From shy football player to 'Crazy Pat, The New York Times (August 22, 1986)
 "Aug. 20, 1986: Just an ordinary day", EnidNews.com (August 20, 2006)
 "15 die in post office rage", The News-Journal (August 21, 1986)
 "Former marine kills 14, self", Lodi News-Sentinel (August 21, 1986)

Murder–suicides in Oklahoma
Suicides by firearm in Oklahoma
Mass murder in Oklahoma
Attacks in the United States in 1986
1986 murders in the United States
Deaths by firearm in Oklahoma
Mass murder in 1986
Mass murder in the United States
1986 mass shootings in the United States
1986 in Oklahoma
Workplace violence in the United States
Edmond, Oklahoma
Crimes in Oklahoma
August 1986 events in the United States
Mass shootings in Oklahoma
Mass shootings in the United States
1986 suicides